Durrell Artaze Babbs (born January 1, 1976), better known by his stage name Tank, is an American R&B singer, songwriter, producer and actor. He is known for the singles "Maybe I Deserve" (2001),  "Please Don't Go" (2007), and "When We" (2017). According to Billboard, Tank has sold 1.76 million albums in the U.S. as of 2013.

Early life 
Durrell Babbs was born in Milwaukee, Wisconsin and moved with his family as a child to Baltimore, Maryland. He was a multisport athlete in high school and was offered the opportunity to play college football. However, Tank decided to focus on music and his talent eventually led him to an opportunity to sing background vocals for Ginuwine during one of the latter's tours. Tank also became a backing singer for Aaliyah, who he had met through Ginuwine in 1997.

Tank later signed as an artist with Aaliyah's record label Blackground Records.

Music career

2001–2007: Force of Nature, One Man and Sex, Love & Pain 
In 2001, Tank released his debut album Force of Nature which spawned the moderate hit Maybe I Deserve". In 2002, Tank released his second album One Man and a single of the same name. In 2002, Tank would later be featured on late R&B singer Aaliyah's first posthumous compilation album, I Care 4 U.

Tank released his third solo album, Sex, Love & Pain, in May 2007. The lead single of the album was the minor hit "Please Don't Go", which peaked at number 21 on the US Billboard Hot 100 chart. Later in the year Tank, Ginuwine and Tyrese Gibson formed a group called TGT. The group was put on hold due to contractual issues, but would go on to sign a contract with Atlantic Records in September 2012.

2010–2014: Now or Never, This Is How I Feel and Stronger 
Tank released his fourth studio album, Now or Never, in December 2010. Tank collaborated with artists who included Chris Brown, Drake, Letoya Luckett on this project. The singles were "Sex Music", "I Can't Make You Love Me", and "Emergency".

Tank released his fifth studio album, This Is How I Feel, in May 2012. Tank collaborated with the artists Chris Brown, Busta Rhymes, T.I. and Kris Stephens on the album. The song "Compliments", featuring Kris Stephens and T.I., was released as the lead single in October 2011.

On September 14, 2013, Tank sang the U.S. national anthem before the Floyd Mayweather vs. Saúl Álvarez fight in Las Vegas, Nevada.

His sixth studio album Stronger was released in August 2014. It featured the singles "You're My Star" and the title track. They did not make the US Hot 100 but both peaked in the Top 20 of the US Urban AC chart. The album marked a slight departure from his previous releases, focusing on a "retro R&B sound" for the album. Following disappointing sales of the release, Tank had claimed the album would be his last.

2015–present: Sex Love & Pain II, Savage and R&B Money 
In February 2015, a mixtape album, If You Were Mine, was released. Later that year, Tank premiered a new single, "You Don't Know", featuring Wale. It served as the lead single for his seventh studio album Sex Love & Pain II, released in January 2016. The album debuted at #1 on the Billboard R&B chart (marking his 5th album to do so) and #15 on the US Top 200 Albums chart. A second single "#BDAY" followed later that year, in addition to a holiday EP A Classic Christmas Night in December, released independently.

In May 2017, Tank performed at Washington DC's Black Gay Pride event, garnering both praise and criticism and setting off a debate concerning the rare instances male R&B artists perform at LGBT events. In September 2017, Tank released his eighth studio album, Savage. The album's lead single "When We", has peaked at number 86 on the Billboard Hot 100. In October 2019, Tank released his ninth studio album ELEVATION. He then released a piano-laced EP titled While You Wait on March 27, 2020.

On February 26, 2021, Tank released the single "Can't Let It Show" of which the chorus interpolates the 1989 Kate Bush single "This Woman's Work". Kate Bush is credited for the song alongside Tank.

In August 2021, it was announced that Blackground Records would be rereleasing discographies of artists including Tank, Aaliyah, Toni Braxton and Timbaland & Magoo.  Tank's first three studio albums were reissued on CD, cassette, vinyl, digital download and for the first time, streaming, on September 17, 2021.

On October 29, 2021, Tank released "I Deserve" from his upcoming tenth and final album R&B Money. The single reached the top 10 on the R&B Radio chart.

Tank was nominated, for the first time, for an American Music Award for Favorite Soul/R&B Male Artist, held on November 21, 2021. He lost to The Weeknd.

Other ventures

Writing and producing 
Tank's songwriting and production credits include working with Aaliyah, Beyoncé, Dave Hollister,  Fantasia Barrino, Kelly Rowland, Marques Houston, Omarion, Jamie Foxx, Pitbull, Donell Jones and Monica as a member of the production team the Underdogs and with his own team, Song Dynasty.

Acting 
He was a contributor to the score of the film adaptation of the musical Dreamgirls, in which he had a cameo. He was also featured in the movie Preacher's Kid. Tank played Donovan in Born Again Virgin (2015–2016).  He also played recording company executive Jheryl Busby in the BET miniseries The New Edition Story (2017), The Bobby Brown Story (2018) and T.I. & Tiny: Friends & Family Hustle (2018).

Personal life 
He got engaged to his longtime girlfriend Zena Foster on January 16, 2017. They've been together on and off since 2000 and share two children, Zion and Zoey. They were married in Los Angeles, California, on July 22, 2018.  There were several celebrities in the ceremony, including Kelly Rowland, Jamie Foxx, Larenz Tate, LeToya Luckett, Steelo Brim and many more.

Tank is also the father of three more children from previous relationships: Jordan, Ryen, and Durrell Jr.

Discography 

Studio albums
 Force of Nature (2001)
 One Man (2002)
 Sex, Love & Pain (2007)
 Now or Never (2010)
 This Is How I Feel (2012)
 Stronger (2014)
 Sex Love & Pain II (2016)
 Savage (2017)
 Elevation (2019)
 R&B Money (2022)

Collaborative albums
 Three Kings  (2013)

Filmography

Film

Television

Awards and nominations

Grammy Awards

Soul Train Music Awards

References

External links 
 Official website
 

1976 births
American hip hop singers
American contemporary R&B singers
Living people
Musicians from Milwaukee
Singers from Washington, D.C.
Atlantic Records artists
American soul singers
21st-century African-American male singers
TGT (group) members